Tiago Adan Fonseca (born 14 March 1988), simply known as Tiago Adan, is a Brazilian professional footballer who plays as a forward for Marsaxlokk in the Maltese Premier League.

Club career

Real Kashmir
On 26 October 2021, Adan signed for the Snow Leopards on a season-long deal.

On 27 December 2021, he made his debut for the club in the I-League, against Aizawl in a 3–2 win, in which he scored a brace.

Marsaxlokk
In June 2022, newly promoted Maltese Premier League club Marsaxlokk secured the services of Adan, on a one-year deal.

Honours
Real Kashmir
 IFA Shield: 2021

References

External links
 Player profile on Astra Ploieşti website

1988 births
Living people
Brazilian footballers
FC Astra Giurgiu players
Club Athletico Paranaense players
Association football forwards
Footballers from São Paulo (state)